Somerset Township may refer to:

 Somerset Township, Jackson County, Illinois
 Somerset Township, Hillsdale County, Michigan
 Somerset Township, Steele County, Minnesota
 Somerset Township, Mercer County, Missouri
 Somerset Township, Belmont County, Ohio
 Somerset Township, Somerset County, Pennsylvania
 Somerset Township, Washington County, Pennsylvania

See also

Somerset (disambiguation)

Township name disambiguation pages